Steamer may refer to:

Transportation
 Steamboat, smaller, insular boat on lakes and rivers
 Steamship, ocean-faring ship
 Screw steamer, steamboat or ship that uses "screws" (propellers)
 Steam yacht, luxury or commercial yacht
 Paddle steamer, steamboat or ship with a paddlewheel
 Steam car, generic term for a car powered by a steam engine
 Stanley Steamer, model of steam-powered car
 Steam locomotive, locomotive propelled by steam-operated pistons

Sports
 Steamer Flanagan (1881–1947), Major League Baseball player
 Steamer Horning (1892–1982), American football player
 Steamer Maxwell (1890–1975), Canadian amateur ice-hockey player
 Stan Smyl (born 1958), captain of the Vancouver Canucks, nicknamed "the Steamer"

Other uses
 Steamer (milk), a flavored milk drink
 Steamer (wetsuit), covers the torso and arms and legs
 Steamer trunk, a type of luggage
 The Steamer, an album by jazz saxophonist Stan Getz
 Clothes steamer
 Food steamer
 Fastball, nickname for the baseball pitch
 Soft-shell clam, nickname for soft-shell clams
 Tachyeres, steamer ducks

See also
 Steam (disambiguation)